Destroyer Squadron 15 is a squadron of United States Navy Arleigh Burke-class destroyers forward deployed to Yokosuka, Japan.

Mission
DESRON FIFTEEN is the Navy's largest forward deployed Destroyer Squadron and is responsible for the readiness, tactical and administrative responsibilities for nine Arleigh Burke Class Destroyers. The Destroyer Squadron Commodore serves as the Immediate Superior in Command (ISIC) of the ships assigned to the squadron. DESRON FIFTEEN ships are the principal surface forces of Battle Force Seventh Fleet in the Western Pacific and Indian Oceans In addition to duties as ISIC for the ships assigned to the squadron, the DESRON FIFTEEN staff also deploys with the Ronald Reagan Carrier Strike Group (CSG). During these deployments, the Deputy Commodore serves as Sea Combat Commander (SCC) for the CSG. The SCC responsibilities include Surface Warfare Commander (SUWC), Anti Submarine Warfare Commander (ASWC), Maritime Intercept Operations Coordinator (MIO), Mine Warfare Coordinator (MIW), and Submarine Operational Controlling Authority (SOCA) (responsible for coordinating employment of attack submarines assigned to the CSG). 

DESRON FIFTEEN has additional assignments in the Seventh Fleet as Commander, Task Force 71 (CTF-71) the Theater Surface Warfare Commander (TSUWC), Maritime Counter - Special Operations Force Commander (MCSOF), Strike Force ASW Commander (SFASWC) and Deputy Ballistic Missile Defense Commander (BMDC).

History
Destroyer Squadron Fifteen was founded in 1920 as a reserve fleet unit. The squadron was disestablished in 1922 and another destroyer squadron was re-designated as Destroyer Squadron Fifteen in 1928. That squadron was then re-designated as Destroyer Squadron 5 in 1931.

Following the U.S. entry into World War II, Destroyer Squadron Fifteen was re-established and fought in Mediterranean battles during the war. In 1945, the squadron was converted to destroyer minesweepers and was again re-designated this time as Mine Squadron 21. In 1946 the squadron was re-activated in the Pacific Fleet but was decommissioned briefly in 1950. Later the same year it was reestablished due to the Korean War. In 1971 the squadron departed San Diego and became a permanently forward deployed squadron stationed in Yokosuka, Japan.  Since this time, DESRON FIFTEEN has serves as the Sea Combat Commander for the USS Midway (CV-41), USS Independence (CV-62), USS Kitty Hawk (CV-63), USS George Washington (CVN-73), and USS Ronald Reagan (CVN-76) Carrier Strike Groups, forward deployed to the Western Pacific.

Destroyer Squadron 15 has taken part in World War II, the Korean War, Vietnam War, Operation Desert Storm, Operation Enduring Freedom and Operation Iraqi Freedom.

The squadron was assigned to Task Force 70 (Battle Force, Seventh Fleet), which had operational control of all carrier strike groups and independently deployed cruisers, destroyers, and frigates that deployed or transited through the 7th Fleet area of operations from 1971 to 2021. In 2021, Commander, U.S. SEVENTH Fleet dissolved Battle Force SEVENTH Fleet and re-designated Commander, Destroyer Squadron FIFTEEN as Commander, Task Force 71 - Theater Surface Warfare Commander for the SEVENTH Fleet Area of Responsibility.  

Today, Destroyer Squadron FIFTEEN, as Theater Surface Warfare Commander exercises control of the Guided Missile Destroyers assigned to the squadron as well as all independent deployments of US Cruisers, Destroyers, and US Coast Guard Cutters deployed to the Seventh Fleet area of responsibility.  DESRON 15 is also the lead coordinating authority for all allied and partner nation Cruiser/Destroyer Surface Action Group operations throughout the AOR and regularly deploys its ships alongside the Japanese Maritime Self Defense Force, Republic of Korea Navy, Royal Australian Navy, Royal Canadian Navy, Royal New Zealand Navy, Royal Navy, and the navies of dozens of other partner nations.  In addition to these duties, DESRON FIFTEEN still provides Sea Combat Commander duties to CTF70, embarked in USS Ronald Reagan (CVN-76).

Ships
The squadron consists of the following ships:

Commodores
 CAPT T.T. Graven Dec 1921-Jul 1922
 CAPT J.C. Chirch Oct 1928-Jul 1930
 CAPT I.F. Dortch Jul 1930-Feb 1931
 CAPT C.C. Hartman Feb 1942-Dec 1943
 CAPT S.W. Dubois Dec 1943-Aug 1944
 CAPT E.R. Durgin Aug 1943-Nov 1944
 CAPT Smith-Hutton Nov 1944-Nov 1945
 CAPT M. Hubbard Jan 1946-Jun 1946
 CAPT F.H. Gardner Jun 1946-Aug 1947
 CAPT R.D. Smith Aug 1947-Aug 1948
 CAPT W.L. Dyer Aug 1948-Apr 1949
 CAPT H.J. Armstrong Jr. Aug 1950-Nov 1951
 CAPT M.M. Zemmer Nov 1951-Apr 1953
 CAPT B.J. Mullaney Oct 1953-May 1953
 CAPT L.B. Baldaue May 1955-Aug 1956
 CAPT F.A. McKee Aug 1956-Dec 1956
 CAPT R.P. Fiala Dec 1956-Feb 1958
 CAPT J.C. Nichols Feb 1958-Apr 1959
 CAPT J.H. Brown Apr 1959-May 1960
 CAPT B.A. Smith May 1960-Jul 1961
 CAPT J.M. Alford Jul 1961-Aug 1962
 CAPT L.F. Hubbell Aug 1962-Jul 1963
 CAPT J.P. Coleman Jul 1963-Jul 1964
 CAPT R.R. Crutchfield Jul 1964-Sep 1964
 CAPT S.T. Orme Sep 1964-Sep 1965
 CAPT W.M. Gantar Sep 1965-Aug 1966
 CAPT C.E. McMullen Aug 1966-Jul 1968
 CAPT L.D. Cummins Jul 1968-Jan 1970
 CAPT J.R. Collier Jan 1970-May 1971
 CAPT E.C. Kline May 1971-Feb 1973
 CAPT E.I. Finke Feb 1973-Mar 1975
 CAPT C.L. Bekkedahl Mar 1975-Oct 1976
 CAPT J.H. Berry Jr. Oct 1976-Dec 1978
 CAPT W.E. Olsen Dec 1978-Mar 1981
 CAPT P.J. Doerr Mar 1981-Feb 1983
 CAPT F.J. Barneds III Feb 1983-Aug 1985
 CAPT W.S. Johnson Sep 1985-Sep 1987
 CAPT R.J. Cepek Sep 1987-Aug 1989
 CAPT J.W. Parker Oct 1989-Aug 1991
 CAPT R.A. Robbins Aug 1991-Jul 1993
 CAPT E.H. Butt IV Jul 1993-Jun 1995
 CAPT R.E. Smith Jun 1995-May 1997
 CAPT J.F. Ferguson May 1997-Jun 1999
 CAPT J.W. Stevenson Jr. Jun 1999-Jan 2001
 CAPT D.W. Davenport Jan 2001-Jun 2001
 CAPT M.A. Mahon Jun 2001-Sep 2003
 RADM S. Perez Jr. Sep 2003-Jun 2005
 RADM R.P. Girrier Jun 2005-Feb 2007
 RADM M.C. Montgomery Apr 2007-Feb 2009
 RDML C.F. Williams Feb 2009-Jun 2010
 CAPT W.T. Wagner Jun 2010-June 2011
 CAPT J.L. Schultz Jun 2011-Dec 2012
 CAPT P.J. Lyons Dec 2012-Apr 2014
 CAPT S.M. Byrne Apr 2014-Aug 2015
 RADM C.J. Sweeney Aug 2015-Sep 2016
 CAPT J.A. Bennett II Sep 2016-Sep 2017
 CAPT J.C. Duffy Sep 2017-Sep 2019
 CAPT S.H. DeMoss Sep 2019-Feb 2021
 CAPT C.R. Sargeant Feb 2021-Aug 2022
 CAPT W.C. Mainor Aug 2022-Present

References

Destroyer squadrons of the United States Navy
Yokosuka
Military units and formations established in 1920